Cedar Bluffs is an unincorporated community in Decatur County, Kansas, United States.

History
A post office was opened at Cedar Bluffs in 1873, and remained in operation until it was discontinued in 1958.

Cedar Bluffs was laid out in about 1882.

Education
The community is served by Oberlin USD 294 public school district.

References

Further reading

External links
 Decatur County maps: Current, Historic, KDOT

Unincorporated communities in Decatur County, Kansas
Unincorporated communities in Kansas